César Barros (born May 1, 1973 in São Paulo) is a Brazilian former motorcycle racer.

He is the brother of Alex Barros.

Career statistics

Grand Prix motorcycle racing

By season

Races by year

(key)

References

External links
Profile on MotoGP.com

Brazilian motorcycle racers
Living people
1973 births
125cc World Championship riders
250cc World Championship riders
Sportspeople from São Paulo